Thiago dos Santos Menezes, commonly known as Thiaguinho, (born 19 May 1990) is a Brazilian footballer who plays for Olímpia Futebol Clube in Campeonato Paulista Série A3.

References

1990 births
Living people
Central Sport Club players
Botafogo Futebol Clube (PB) players
Guarani FC players
Clube Náutico Capibaribe players
Comercial Futebol Clube (Ribeirão Preto) players
Associação Desportiva Recreativa e Cultural Icasa players
Association football forwards
Brazilian footballers